"'Love Is Fair" is a song written by Kye Fleming and Dennis Morgan, and recorded by American country music artist Barbara Mandrell.  It was released in January 1981 as the third and final single and title track from the album Love Is Fair.  It peaked at number 13 on the U.S. Billboard Hot Country Singles chart and number 7 on the Canadian RPM Country Tracks chart.

Chart performance

References

1981 singles
Barbara Mandrell songs
Songs written by Kye Fleming
Songs written by Dennis Morgan (songwriter)
Song recordings produced by Tom Collins (record producer)
MCA Records singles
1980 songs